Paul Delmet (Paris 17 June 1862 – 28 October 1904 Paris) was a French composer.

He was portrayed by Tino Rossi in the 1950 film Sending of Flowers.

1862 births
1904 deaths
French composers
French male composers
19th-century French male singers